Exoneration occurs when the conviction for a crime is reversed, either through demonstration of innocence, a flaw in the conviction, or otherwise. Attempts to exonerate convicts are particularly controversial in death penalty cases, especially where new evidence is put forth after the execution has taken place. The transitive verb, "to exonerate" can also mean to informally absolve one from blame.

The term "exoneration" also is used in criminal law to indicate a surety bail bond has been satisfied, completed, and exonerated. The judge orders the bond exonerated; the clerk of court time stamps the original bail bond power and indicates exonerated as the judicial order.

Based on DNA evidence
DNA evidence is a relatively new instrument of exoneration. The first convicted defendant from a United States prison to be released on account of DNA testing was David Vasquez, who had been convicted of homicide, in 1989. Recently, DNA evidence has been used to exonerate a number of persons either on death row or serving lengthy prison sentences. , the number of states authorizing convicts to request DNA testing on their behalf, since 1999, has increased from two to thirty. Access to DNA testing varies greatly by degree; post-conviction tests can be difficult to acquire. Organizations like the Innocence Project and Centurion are particularly concerned with the exoneration of those who have been convicted based on weak or faulty evidence, regardless of DNA evidence. As of October 2003, prosecutors of criminal cases must approve the defendant's request for DNA testing in certain cases.

Monday, April 23, 2007, Jerry Miller became the 200th person in the United States exonerated through the use of DNA evidence. There is a national campaign in support of the formation of state Innocence Commissions, statewide entities that identify causes of wrongful convictions and develop state reforms that can improve the criminal justice system.

As of December 2018, 362 people in the U.S. had been exonerated based on DNA tests. In nearly half of these cases, faulty forensics contributed to the original conviction.

Per February 4, 2014 NPR article, Laura Sullivan cited Samuel Gross, a University of Michigan law professor stating that exonerations were on the rise, and not just because of DNA evidence. Only one-fifth of the exonerations last year relied on newly tested DNA, a little less than a third of exonerations occurred due to further investigating by law enforcement agencies.

According to a 2020 study, DNA exonerations in rape cases "strongly suggest that the wrongful-conviction rate is significantly higher among black convicts than white convicts."

Exonerees after exoneration
Wrongful conviction has many social, economic, and psychological consequences for people later exonerated, especially for death row exonerees. 

After exoneration, some exonerees publicly have joined or formed organizations like Witness to Innocence and the Innocence Project to tell their stories as a form of advocacy against the death penalty, prison conditions, or other criminal justice issues.

See also
National Registry of Exonerations
List of exonerated death row inmates
List of wrongful convictions in the United States

References

External links
National Registry of Exonerations, a registry of exonerations in the United States since 1989; a joint project of the University of Michigan Law School and Northwestern University School of Law

Criminal procedure
Wrongful convictions